The Chunghyeon Museum is a museum in Gwangmyeong, Gyeonggi-do, South Korea.

Mission
The Chunghyeon Museum aims to preserve and promote Seonbi culture by displaying artifacts that once belonged to Ori Yi Won-ik (1547-1634), a prime minister during the Joseon Dynasty. The museum emphasizes traditional Korean culture, especially the "loyalty and filial piety from Joseon period Confucianism," and conducts educational programs incorporating museum material.

History
The Chunghyeon Museum is a jongga ("house of the head family") museum, in that it enshrines the former residence of a renowned family member. As the practice of ancestral veneration for a family is continued by the eldest son, this jongga "was founded by Dr. Yi Seunggyu, Yi Won-ik's thirteenth-generation eldest son, and his wife, Ham Geumja," who are also the directors and curators.

Exhibits
The museum encompasses an exhibition hall, a shrine, pavilions, and a family cemetery, as well as Yi Won-ik's original house from the late sixteenth century. Items on display include furniture, portraits, writings, and personal items that belonged to or were created by Yi Won-ik.

See also
List of museums in South Korea

References

External links
Official site

Museums in Gyeonggi Province
Biographical museums in South Korea